Adina Anton (born 6 October 1984 in Piteşti, Argeş) is a retired Romanian long jumper. She finished 5th in the long jump final at the 2006 European Athletics Championships in Gothenburg. Anton was the 2002 World Junior champion and also competed in the 2004 Olympics.

Competition record

References

External links

1984 births
Living people
Romanian female long jumpers
Athletes (track and field) at the 2004 Summer Olympics
Olympic athletes of Romania
Competitors at the 2005 Summer Universiade
Sportspeople from Pitești